The Foolish Club were the owners of the eight original franchises of the American Football League (AFL).  When Texas oil magnates Lamar Hunt and Bud Adams, Jr. were refused entry to the established NFL in 1959, they contacted other businessmen to form an eight-team professional football league, and called it the American Football League.  Though Max Winter had originally committed to fielding a Minneapolis team, he reneged when lured away by the NFL; Winter's group instead joined the NFL as the Minnesota Vikings in 1961  (the Minneapolis AFL franchise only went as far as participating in the 1960 American Football League Draft and never actually fielded a team).  Hunt owned the Dallas Texans (now the Kansas City Chiefs), while the Houston Oilers (now the Tennessee Titans) were Adams' franchise.  The other six members of the "Original Eight" were Harry Wismer (New York Titans, now the New York Jets), Bob Howsam (Denver Broncos), Barron Hilton (Los Angeles Chargers), Ralph C. Wilson, Jr. (Buffalo Bills), Billy Sullivan (Boston Patriots, now the New England Patriots), and a group of eight investors led primarily by F. Wayne Valley and, briefly, Chet Soda (Oakland Raiders, now the Las Vegas Raiders, who replaced the Minneapolis team).  They called themselves the "Foolish Club" because of their seemingly foolhardy venture in taking on the established NFL.

The league quickly became a viable competitor to the established league, in its first year signing half of the NFL's first-round draft choices, and introducing the first professional football gate and TV revenue-sharing plans, which made it financially stable.  It went on to develop its own stars, and after forcing a merger with the NFL in 1966, the now 10-team league entered the NFL intact in 1970.  It became the only league ever to merge with another without losing any franchises. It was the raison d'être for the first Professional Football World Championship Games (later called the Super Bowl), and after losing the first two games of that series to the Green Bay Packers of the elder league, closed out its ten-year existence with victories over the NFL's best teams after the 1968 (with the Jets upsetting the then-Baltimore Colts) and 1969 (the Chiefs defeating the Vikings) seasons.

In the first exhibition game of the 2009 NFL season, the Pro Football Hall of Fame Game on August 9, both the Bills and Titans faced off, with both teams wearing their 1960s throwback uniforms as the Titans wearing the colors of the Houston Oilers.  This contest kicked off what would have been the AFL's 50th season, featuring "AFL Legacy Weekends", in which teams of the "Original Eight" played one another wearing AFL period uniforms, game officials wore AFL "Chinese Red" striped uniforms and fields were designed in the innovative style used during the 1960s.  The first regular season games served as the Monday Night Football season opener on September 14 as the Bills visited the now-New England Patriots and the current San Diego Chargers visited the Oakland Raiders.

The last surviving member of the Foolish Club, Barron Hilton, died in 2019; he had sold off the Chargers in 1966 to appease the board of directors of Hilton Hotels. With the AFL struggling in its early years, Howsam sold the Broncos after the first season, while Wismer sold the New York club in 1963. The Valley group eventually sold their shares of the Raiders in the 1970s after Al Davis took control over the club's team operations. After infamously bankrolling The Jackson Five's 1984 Victory Tour, financial difficulties forced Sullivan to sell his ownership stake in the Patriots in 1988 while Foxboro Stadium lapsed into bankruptcy; Sullivan remained team president until 1992 while Robert Kraft purchased the stadium out of bankruptcy to eventually use as leverage to buy the team in 1994.  Ralph Wilson died in 2014 as Bills owner, but the estate instead auctioned off the Bills to the highest bidder when he died (his two surviving daughters were not directly involved in the team's operations during his lifetime).

Heirs of two Foolish Club members continue to own their teams.  Norma Hunt, Lamar Hunt's widow, and their children continue to own the Chiefs, with Norma owning a minority stake while the children have split the team equally, with son Clark the owner of record since Lamar's death in 2006.  After Bud Adams' death in 2013, daughter Susie Smith was the original Titans' owner of record, but has since divested herself of interest, and the remaining family members have kept their stakes -- sister Amy Strunk (who has controlled the team officially since 2016), with an equal share held by the connections of their brother, Kenneth S. Adams III, who died in 1987, of his widow Susan Lewis and their sons Kenneth S. Adams IV and Barclay Adams.

Members

See also
 Other American Football League officials, coaches and players
 Current National Football League team owners

External links
 Schedule of American Football League Legacy Games
 ESPN.com article on AFL Legacy Games
 USA TODAY series on the American Football League